Karl Alf Staffan Lindfors (born 26 December 1968 in Kårböle, Sweden) is a Swedish musician, songwriter and producer, best known as bassist in the band Östen med Resten (since 1994) and Sofia Karlsson's band.

References

External links
https://web.archive.org/web/20120205202957/http://www.ostenmedresten.se/omoss.php
http://www.staffanlindfors.se/

Swedish songwriters
1968 births
Living people
Melodifestivalen contestants of 2003
Melodifestivalen contestants of 2002